Muhammad Islam is a Pakistani politician who was a Member of the Provincial Assembly of Balochistan, from May 2013 to May 2018.

Personal life and education
He was born in Panjgur District.

He has completed Matriculation.

He is a landlord by profession.

Political career

He was elected to the Provincial Assembly of Balochistan as a candidate of National Party from Constituency PB-43 Panjgoor-II in 2013 Pakistani general election.

References

Living people
Balochistan MPAs 2013–2018
Year of birth missing (living people)
Pakistani landlords